The Men's synchronized 10 metre platform competition at the 2019 World Aquatics Championships was held on 15 July 2019.

Results
The preliminary round was started at 13:00. The final was held at 20:45.

Green denotes finalists

References

Men's synchronized 10 metre platform